Invest Ukraine is a state enterprise operating under the State Agency for Investment and National Projects (National Projects), which serves as a one stop shop for investors and delivers investments consulting services in Ukraine. It was founded on 22 May 2009 and included in National Project's structure on 30  June 2010.

Activity
Invest Ukraine provides  professional services, including information about investment opportunities and liaison within the Government to prospective and current investors. It promotes Ukraine as an investment destination through networking, conferences and events, media relations, Ukraine's diplomatic missions abroad, and thought leadership. InvestUkraine is located in Kyiv, Ukraine and features a multilingual staff.

Invest Ukraine provides services to prospective and current investors free of charge. Activities include:
 Providing information about investment opportunities
 Assisting with identifying and locating project sites, vendors, service providers, and other resources
 Initiating contact with potential investment partners and maintaining investment projects database
 Liaison with government agencies and officials
 Linking investors with regional and local community leaders
 Providing assistance in registering a business in Ukraine

References

External links
 InvestUkraine's official site
 National Projects's official site

State companies of Ukraine
Investment promotion agencies
Foreign direct investment
Development in Europe